The Lost World of Tibet is a BBC documentary film produced in conjunction with the British Film Institute. The 90-minute film was broadcast on BBC Two in November 2006.

The film is presented by Dan Cruickshank and features footage shot in Tibet prior to the 1950s with commentary from the Tenzin Gyatso, 14th Dalai Lama, and other people featured.

This is one of a number of BFI television series featuring footage from the BFI National Archive and produced in partnership with the BBC:
The Lost World of Mitchell & Kenyon
The Lost World of Friese-Greene
The Lost World of Tibet

External links 
 
 

BBC television documentaries about history
British Film Institute
2006 British television series debuts
History of Tibet